Isoperla pinta, the checkered stripetail, is a species of green-winged stonefly in the family Perlodidae. It is found in North America.

References

Perlodidae
Articles created by Qbugbot
Insects described in 1937